Pelochyta albipars is a moth of the family Erebidae. It was described by George Hampson in 1914. It is found in Peru, and French Guiana.

References

Pelochyta
Moths described in 1916